Ajay Srivastava (born 17 August 1981) is an Indian film director, producer, music composer, writer and actor, known for his works in Bhojpuri films.

Filmography

2022
|Kahani (Under Production)
|Director, Writer
|}
2022
|Apharan (Under Production)
|Producer, Director, Writer 
|}

References

External links

 

Living people
1981 births
Hindi-language film directors
Indian male screenwriters
Hindi film producers
Indian film score composers
Bhojpuri-language film directors
Film directors from Uttar Pradesh
20th-century Indian film directors
21st-century Indian film directors
Film producers from Uttar Pradesh